Masahiro Mori may refer to:

 Masahiro Mori (roboticist) (born 1927), Japanese roboticist
 Masahiro Mori (designer) (1927–2005), Japanese ceramic designer